Başak is a village in the Silopi district of Şırnak Province in Turkey. The village is populated by Kurds of non-tribal affiliation and had a population of 2 in 2021.

References 

Villages in Silopi District
Kurdish settlements in Şırnak Province